The 2013 Torneo Transición was the 63rd completed season of the Primera B de Chile.

Universidad de Concepción was the tournament's champion.

Classification

North Zone

South Zone

Promotion play-offs

References

External links
 RSSSF 2013

Primera B de Chile seasons
Primera B
Chil